The United Arab Emirates Handball Federation (UAEHF) is an administrative body for handball and beach handball in United Arab Emirates. It is a member of the Asian Handball Federation (AHF) and the International Handball Federation (IHF) since 1975.

Reference

External link

Handball